Vasse Felix was the first vineyard and winery to be established in the Margaret River wine region of Western Australia. Founded in Wilyabrup in 1967 by Dr Tom Cullity, it is recognised as a pioneer of the region, and also features an acclaimed restaurant in Cowaramup.

History

The first vintage at Vasse Felix was disappointing, with the harvest being substantially reduced by attacks from silver eyes, and by the after-effects of bunch rot.  However, by the 1970s the winery was winning medals at the Perth Royal Show.

Restaurant
The restaurant at Vasse Felix was awarded two stars, and won the award for the Regional Restaurant of the Year, in The West Australian Good Food Guide 2013.

See also

 Australian wine
 Heytesbury Pty Ltd
 Janet Holmes à Court
 Robert Holmes à Court
 List of wineries in Western Australia
 Western Australian wine

References

Notes

Bibliography

External links
Vasse Felix – official site

Restaurants in Western Australia
Wineries in Western Australia
Companies based in Perth, Western Australia
1967 establishments in Australia
Restaurants established in 1967
Cowaramup, Western Australia
Wilyabrup, Western Australia